Subrahmanyam Jaishankar (born 9 January 1955) is an Indian diplomat and politician serving as the Minister of External Affairs of the Government of India since 30 May 2019. He is a member of the Bharatiya Janata Party and a Member of Parliament in the Rajya Sabha since 5 July 2019. He previously served as the Foreign Secretary from January 2015 to January 2018.

He joined the Indian Foreign Service (IFS) in 1977 and during his diplomatic career spanning over 38 years, he served in different capacities in India and abroad including as a High Commissioner to Singapore (2007–09) and as Ambassador to the Czech Republic (2001–04), China (2009–2013) and the US (2014–2015). Jaishankar played a key role in negotiating the Indo-US civilian nuclear agreement.

On retirement, Jaishankar joined Tata Sons as the President, Global Corporate Affairs. In 2019, he was conferred with Padma Shri, India's fourth highest civilian honour. On 30 May 2019, he was sworn in as a cabinet minister in the second Modi ministry. He was made the Minister of External Affairs on 31 May 2019. He is the first former Foreign Secretary to head the Ministry of External Affairs as the Cabinet Minister.

Early life and education
Jaishankar was born in a Tamil Brahmin family in Delhi, India to prominent Indian strategic affairs analyst, commentator and civil servant K. Subrahmanyam and Sulochana Subrahmanyam. He has two brothers: the historian Sanjay Subrahmanyam and the IAS officer S. Vijay Kumar, former Rural Development Secretary of India.

Jaishankar did schooling from The Air Force School, Subroto Park, New Delhi, and from the Bangalore Military School, Bangalore, Karnataka, and is a graduate in Chemistry from St. Stephen's College at the University of Delhi. He has an MA in Political Science and an M.Phil. and PhD in International Relations from Jawaharlal Nehru University (JNU), where he specialised in nuclear diplomacy.

Diplomatic career
After joining the Indian Foreign Service in 1977, Jaishankar served as third secretary and second secretary in the Indian mission to the Soviet Union in Moscow from 1979 to 1981, where he studied Russian. He returned to New Delhi, where he worked as a special assistant to the diplomat Gopalaswami Parthasarathy and as undersecretary in the Americas division of India's Ministry of External Affairs, dealing with United States. He was part of the team that resolved the dispute over the supply of US nuclear fuel to the Tarapur Power Stations in India. From 1985 to 1988 he was the first secretary at the Indian embassy in Washington, D.C.

From 1988 to 1990, he served in Sri Lanka as First Secretary and political adviser to the Indian Peacekeeping Force (IPKF). From 1990 to 1993, he was Counsellor (Commercial) at the Indian mission in Budapest. Returning to New Delhi, he served as Director (East Europe) in the Ministry of External Affairs and as press secretary and speechwriter for President of India Shankar Dayal Sharma.

Jaishankar was then Deputy Chief of Mission at the Indian Embassy in Tokyo from 1996 to 2000. This period saw a downturn in Indo-Japan relations following India's Pokhran-II nuclear tests as well as a recovery after a visit to India by then Japanese Prime Minister Yoshiro Mori. Jaishankar is reported to have helped introduce future Japanese Prime Minister Shinzō Abe to his Indian counterpart, Manmohan Singh. In 2000, he was appointed India's ambassador to the Czech Republic.

From 2004 to 2007, Jaishankar was Joint Secretary (Americas) at the Ministry of External Affairs in New Delhi. In this capacity, he was involved in negotiating the US-India civil nuclear agreement and improving defence co-operation, including during relief operations following the 2004 Indian Ocean tsunami. Jaishankar was also involved with the conclusion of the 2005 New Defense Framework and the Open Skies Agreement, and he was associated with the launch of the US-India Energy Dialogue, the India-US Economic Dialogue, and the India-US CEO's Forum. In 2006–2007, Jaishankar led the Indian team during the negotiations on the 123 Agreement with United States. He also represented the Indian government at the Carnegie Endowment International Non-proliferation Conference in June 2007.

Jaishankar was reportedly considered for the post of India's Foreign Secretary in 2013.

High Commissioner to Singapore
From 2007 to 2009, Jaishankar served as India's High Commissioner to Singapore. During his tenure, he helped implement the Comprehensive Economic Cooperation Agreement (CECA) that expanded the Indian business presence in Singapore, and oversaw a defence arrangement by which Singapore keeps some of its military equipment in India on a permanent basis. Jaishankar also promoted the Pravasi Bharatiya Divas, and IIMPact in Singapore.

Ambassador to China
Jaishankar was India's longest-serving ambassador to China, with a four-and-a-half-year term. In Beijing, Jaishankar was involved in improving economic, trade and cultural relations between China and India, and in managing the Sino-Indian border dispute.

Jaishankar's tenure as India's ambassador to China coincided with several major developments in relations between the two countries. His 2010 briefing to the Indian Cabinet Committee on Security regarding China's refusal to issue a visa to the head of the Indian Army’s Northern Command led to a suspension of Indian defence co-operation with China, before the situation was resolved in April 2011. Also in 2010, Jaishankar negotiated an end to the Chinese policy of issuing stapled visas to Indians from Jammu and Kashmir. In 2012, in response to Chinese passports showing Arunachal Pradesh and Aksai Chin as parts of China, he ordered visas issued to Chinese nationals showing those territories as parts of India. And in May 2013, he negotiated the end of a stand-off resulting from the encampment by China's People's Liberation Army on Ladakh’s Depsang Plains, threatening to cancel Premier Li Keqiang’s scheduled visit to India if Chinese forces did not withdraw (See also 2013 Daulat Beg Oldi Incident). Jaishankar also briefed the media after the conclusion of Li's visit to New Delhi in May 2013.

Jaishankar advocated deeper Indian co-operation with China as long as India's "core interests" were respected, and argued for better market access for Indian businesses operating in China on the grounds that more balanced trade was necessary for the bilateral economic relationship to be sustainable. He was also involved in improving people-to-people contacts between India and China, promoting events that showcased Indian culture in 30 Chinese cities.

Ambassador to United States
Jaishankar was appointed as India's Ambassador to United States in September 2013. He took charge on 23 December 2013 succeeding Nirupama Rao. He arrived in United States amid the Devyani Khobragade incident, and was involved in negotiating the Indian diplomat's departure from United States. On 29 January 2014, Jaishankar addressed the Carnegie Endowment for International Peace, where he argued that "the grand strategy underwriting [Indian-American] ties is fundamentally sound" but that ties suffered from a "problem of sentiment."

On 10 March 2014, he formally presented his credentials to US President Barack Obama at the Oval Office.

Jaishankar was involved in planning of the Indian Prime Minister Narendra Modi's maiden visit to United States in September 2014, welcoming him upon his arrival and hosting a dinner in his honour for members of the Indian-American community.

Foreign Secretary
Jaishankar was appointed as Foreign Secretary of India on 29 January 2015. The announcement of his appointment was made following a 28 January 2015 meeting of the Appointments Committee of the Cabinet chaired by the Prime Minister, Narendra Modi. Jaishankar is widely criticised by Nepalese analysts for being the "original planner of 2015 Nepal blockade".

Political career

Minister of External Affairs 
On 31 May 2019, he was appointed to the Office of Minister of External Affairs. Jaishankar was sworn in as Cabinet minister on 30 May 2019.

On 5 July 2019, he was elected as Member of Parliament from Bharatiya Janata Party to the Rajya Sabha from Gujarat state. He succeeded late Sushma Swaraj who was the External Affairs Minister in Narendra Modi's Government in his first stint.

In October 2020, Jaishankar and the Indian Minister of Defence, Rajnath Singh met with US Secretary of State Mike Pompeo and US Secretary of Defense Mark T. Esper to sign the Basic Exchange and Cooperation Agreement on Geospatial Cooperation (BECA), which facilitates the sharing of sensitive information and intelligence—including access to highly-accurate nautical, aeronautical, topographical, and geospatial data—between United States and India. The agreement had been under discussion for over a decade, but previous concerns over information security impelled the United Progressive Alliance (UPA) coalition government to block it. In response to the dialogue, Chinese spokesperson for the Ministry of Foreign Affairs Wang Wenbin criticised the move and advised Pompeo to "abandon his Cold War mentality, zero-sum mindset, and stop harping on the 'China threat.'"

In November 2022, during a joint press conference along with Russian foreign minister Sergey Lavrov, Jaishankar praised Russia as "exceptionally steady" and "time-tested" partner of India and advocated a return to dialogue and peace between Russia and Ukraine.

Personal life

Jaishankar is married to Kyoko, who is of Japanese origin and has two sons, Dhruva and Arjun, and a daughter, Medha. He speaks Russian, English, Tamil, Hindi, conversational Japanese, Chinese and some Hungarian. Jaishankar was married to Shobha, who he meet while studying at university, until her death.

Bibliography

References

External links

 Ambassador’s Bio Data, Embassy of India, Washington DC
 Interview, China Central Television, 3 August 2010

|-

|-

1955 births
Indian Foreign Secretaries
Living people
St. Stephen's College, Delhi alumni
Jawaharlal Nehru University alumni
People from Delhi
High Commissioners of India to Singapore
Ambassadors of India to the United States
Ambassadors of India to China
Ambassadors of India to the Czech Republic
Indian Foreign Service officers
Narendra Modi ministry
Members of the Cabinet of India
Ministers for External Affairs of India
Rajya Sabha members from Gujarat
Recipients of the Padma Shri in civil service
Rajya Sabha members from the Bharatiya Janata Party